The Lessons of History is a 1968 book by historians Will Durant and Ariel Durant.

The book provides a summary of periods and trends in history they had noted upon completion of the 10th volume of their momentous eleven-volume The Story of Civilization. Will Durant stated that he and Ariel "made note of events and comments that might illuminate present affairs, future probabilities, the nature of man, and the conduct of states."

Thus, the book presents an overview of the themes and lessons observed from 5,000 years of human history, examined from 12 perspectives:  geography, biology, race, character, morals, religion, economics, socialism, government, war, growth and decay, and progress.

Reception
John Barkham called the work a "masterpiece of distillation", praising the authors' balanced treatment of such concepts as the trade-offs between liberty and equality and the tensions between religion and secularism in modern societies.

Notes

References
 Will and Ariel Durant, The Lessons of History, 1st ed., New York, Simon & Schuster, 1968.

Books by Will Durant
History books
1968 non-fiction books
Interdisciplinary historical research
Works about the theory of history
World history